In the Realm of the Senses (Japanese: , Ai no Korīda, "Bullfight of Love") is a 1976 erotic art film written and directed by Nagisa Ōshima. It is a fictionalised and sexually explicit treatment of a 1936 murder committed by Sada Abe. An international coproduction of France and Japan, the film generated great controversy at the time of its release. The film had the involvement of pink film luminary Kōji Wakamatsu as co-screenwriter and assistant producer. While intended for mainstream wide release, the film contains scenes of unsimulated sexual activity between the actors (Eiko Matsuda and Tatsuya Fuji, among others).

Plot
In 1936 Tokyo, Sada Abe is a former prostitute who now works as a maid in a hotel. The hotel's owner Kichizo Ishida molests her, and the two begin an intense affair that consists of sexual experiments and various self-indulgences. Ishida leaves his wife to pursue his affair with Sada. Sada becomes increasingly possessive and jealous of Ishida, and Ishida more eager to please her. Their mutual obsession escalates until Ishida finds that she is most excited by strangling him during lovemaking, and he is killed in this fashion. Sada then severs his penis. While she is shown next to him naked, it is mentioned that she will walk around with his penis inside her for several days. Words written with blood can be read on his chest: "Sada Kichi the two of us forever."

Cast

Title
The film was released under the title of In the Realm of the Senses in the U.S. and the U.K., and under L'Empire des sens (Empire of the Senses) in France. The French title was taken from Roland Barthes's book about Japan, L'Empire des signes (Empire of Signs, 1970).

The original Japanese title Ai no Korīda was later reimagined as the title of the 1979 funk song "Ai No Corrida", originally recorded by Chaz Jankel and later brought to success by Quincy Jones in 1981.

Censorship
Strict censorship laws in Japan would not have allowed the film to be made according to Ōshima's vision. This obstruction was bypassed by officially listing the production as a French enterprise, and the undeveloped footage was shipped to France for processing and editing. At its premiere in Japan, the film's sexual activity was optically censored using reframing and blurring.

In the United States, the film was initially banned upon its premiere at the 1976 New York Film Festival but was later screened uncut, and a similar fate awaited the film when it was released in Germany. It was also banned because of a scene in which Kichi pushes an egg into Sada's vulva, forcing her to push it out of her vagina before Kichi eats the egg. The film was not available on home video until 1990, although it was sometimes seen uncut in film clubs.

At the time, the only European country in which the film was banned was Belgium. The ban was lifted in 1994, and Belgium has not censored a film of any kind since.

At the time of its initial screening at the 1976 London Film Festival, the British Board of Film Censors recommended that it be shown under private cinema club conditions to avoid the need for heavy cuts, but only after the Obscene Publications Act had been extended to films in 1977 to avoid potential legal problems. The film opened at the Gate Cinema Club in 1978. It was given an official countrywide cinema release in 1991, though the video release was delayed until 2000 when it was passed with an "18" certificate (suitable for adults only). All of the adult sexual activity was left intact, but a shot in which Sada yanks the penis of a prepubescent boy after he misbehaves was reframed, zooming in so that only the reaction of the boy was shown. In Australia, the film was originally banned, but a censored version was made available in 1977. In 2000, it finally became available in its complete version. The graphic sexual content of the production also caused it to be banned in Israel in 1987.

The film is available in uncut form in France, Germany, the United States (as part of The Criterion Collection), the Netherlands, Belgium and several other territories.

In Canada, when originally submitted to the provincial film boards in the 1970s, the film was rejected in all jurisdictions except Quebec and British Columbia. It was not until 1991 that individual provinces approved the film and gave it a certificate. However, in the Maritimes, the film was rejected again as the policies followed in the 1970s were still enforced.

In Brazil, the film was banned during the military dictatorship due to its explicit sex scenes. The ban was lifted in 1980.

Controversy
Because of its sexual themes and explicit scenes, the film was the cause of great controversy in Portugal in 1991 after it aired on RTP. Some deemed it inappropriate even for the watershed slot, while others appreciated its airing. The film aired again on RTP2, almost unnoticed.

Box office

Critical reception 
On review aggregator website Rotten Tomatoes, the film holds a rating of 86% based on 36 critic reviews, with an average rating of 7.7 out of 10. The website's critical consensus reads, "Sexual taboos are broken and boundaries crossed In the Realm of the Senses, a fearlessly provocative psychosexual tale."

See also
 Unsimulated sex
 Nudity in film (East Asian cinema since 1929)

References

Sources
 
 
 Kenny, Patrick T. M. (2007) Conflicting Legal and Cultural Conceptions of Obscenity in Japan: Hokusai's Shunga and Oshima Nagisa's "L'Empire des sens". Earlham College thesis

Further reading
 Joan Mellen. L'Empire des sens. London: British Film Institute, 2004.

External links
 
 
 
 In the Realm of the Senses: Some Notes on Oshima and Pornography  an essay by Donald Richie at the Criterion Collection
 Nagisa Oshima on In the Realm of the Senses an essay by Nagisa Oshima at the Criterion Collection

1976 films
1970s erotic drama films
Japanese erotic drama films
French erotic drama films
Japanese multilingual films
French multilingual films
1970s Japanese-language films
Drama films based on actual events
Films about prostitution in Japan
Films set in 1936
Films set in Tokyo
Films shot in Japan
Adultery in films
BDSM in films
1976 multilingual films
Censored films
Obscenity controversies in film
Necrophilia in film
Films directed by Nagisa Ōshima
Films produced by Anatole Dauman
Cultural depictions of Sada Abe
1976 drama films
Film controversies in the United Kingdom
Film controversies in Australia
Film controversies in France
Film controversies in Germany
Film controversies in Belgium
Film controversies in Japan
Film controversies in Portugal
Film censorship in the United Kingdom
Film censorship in Australia
Film censorship in France
Film censorship in Germany
Film censorship in Belgium
Film censorship in Japan
Film censorship in Portugal
Nudity in film
1970s Japanese films
1970s French films